Boagrius is a genus of palp-footed spiders that was first described by Eugène Louis Simon in 1893.  it contains only two species, found only in Indonesia, Malaysia, and Tanzania: B. incisus and B. pumilus.

See also
 List of Palpimanidae species

References

Araneomorphae genera
Palpimanidae
Spiders of Africa
Spiders of Asia